Feyerharm Knoll is an ice-covered knoll protruding to  in a  terrain on the lower northeastern slope of Mount Sidley, in the Executive Committee Range of Marie Byrd Land, Antarctica. It was surveyed by the United States Geological Survey during the Executive Committee Range Traverse of 1959, and was named by the Advisory Committee on Antarctic Names for William R. Feyerharm, a meteorologist at Byrd Station, 1960.

References 

Hills of Marie Byrd Land
Executive Committee Range